Knocking Piece II is a piece of music by Ben Johnston. It is a continuation of Knocking Piece I. 

In both pieces, Johnston calls to demonstrate unconventional methods of playing conventional instruments. In Knocking Piece II, percussionists use bouncy balls, brushes on their playing surfaces as they also use a deck of cards for instructions. 
	The instrumentation of Knocking Piece II is undefined, and there are various symbols represent different actions. For example, “X” signifies super balls, which are the bouncy balls that are used to play the playing surface. 

Seven percussionists and one sound technician fulfill their duties according to the playing cards’ instructions. While seven percussionists play their playing surfaces, the sound technician uses the mixer or the soundboard to follow instructions.
	In addition to some guidelines for allowing different qualities in the sound of the percussion instruments, a deck of cards is used to give further instructions. For example, suits determine loudness.

References
Johnston, Ben. Number Four: Knocking Piece II. Smith Publications, 1990.

Musical compositions